James Radford (1 October 1928 – 6 November 2020) was an English folk singer-songwriter, peace campaigner and community activist. He was also the youngest known participant in the Allied invasion of Normandy in June 1944.

The first song Radford wrote, "The Shores of Normandy", is also his most successful and best known, having been performed by him at two televised concerts at the Royal Albert Hall in 2014 and released as a single in May 2019 to raise funds for the Normandy Memorial Trust. It topped the Amazon and iTunes download charts in the first week of June 2019, and reached number 72 on the official charts.

Life and career
Radford was born in Hull, East Riding of Yorkshire, England in October 1928. He became a member of the Merchant Navy at 15 and later joined the Royal Navy upon turning 18.

He later became active in various peace campaigns. He retired after a varied career which included time as an Engineering Worker, in the press and in various roles in Community Work and Social Action initiatives.

Radford performed his song, "The Shores of Normandy", at the Royal Albert Hall in London in the 70th anniversary year of the invasion in 2014. In October 2015 Radford was appointed a Chevalier of the Légion d'Honneur by the French Republic "in recognition of... steadfast involvement in the Liberation of France during the Second World War".

He died from COVID-19 on 6 November 2020, after spending three weeks in intensive care. He was 92.

See also
 List of peace activists

References

1928 births
2020 deaths
Military personnel from Kingston upon Hull
British Merchant Navy personnel of World War II
Chevaliers of the Légion d'honneur
Deaths from the COVID-19 pandemic in England
English anti-war activists
English folk musicians
English folk singers
People from Kingston upon Hull
20th-century squatters
20th-century Royal Navy personnel
Child soldiers in World War II